The Men's 90 kg powerlifting event at the 2004 Summer Paralympics was competed  on 26 September. It was won by Park Jong Chul, representing .

Final round

26 Sept. 2004, 17:15

References

M